is a Japanese manga magazine which was published by Ichijinsha from April 24, 2010 to February 25, 2014, for 16 issues. The manga in Waai! focus on male characters who engage in cross-dressing, willingly or due to circumstance; the magazine also includes articles, interviews, and reviews. Its sister magazine  was published for 6 issues from April 25, 2012 to December 25, 2013, and only contains manga.

The main magazine started as a special issue of the publisher's Monthly Comic Rex, before getting spun out as a separate publication. The creation of the magazine was pushed for by its editor-in-chief, Toshinaga Hijikata, a cross-dresser and writer of books about cross-dressing, who aimed to create a magazine with wider appeal than the more sexual cross-dressing magazines that came before it.

Manga featured in the magazines include one-shots and series, which often combine the cross-dressing conceit with themes of gay male romance and societal rules of femininity; among the serializations are Dicca Suemitsu's Reversible! (2010–2013), Rika Kamiyoshi's Sazanami Cherry (2010–2011), and Norio Tsukudani's Himegoto (2011–2014), the latter of which saw an anime adaptation in 2014. At first the magazine was primarily popular with male audiences, but it gradually also built a female following, which by late 2011 represented about a third of its readership.

History
Waai! began on April 24, 2010 as a special issue of publisher Ichijinsha's manga magazine Monthly Comic Rex with a focus on otokonoko, after being teased at Comiket in December 2009. The special drew a lot of attention, leading to it being continued as a Monthly Comic Rex special for two more volumes, before being spun out into a stand-alone magazine with the launch of volume 4 on February 25, 2011. The magazine's editor-in-chief Toshinaga Hijikata was a driving force behind its creation, being a cross-dresser, a reader of otokonoko fiction, and a writer of books about cross-dressing. According to Hijikata, the proposal to create the magazine went smoothly without much trouble as Ichijinsha had noticed the popularity of cross-dressing fiction. The rest of the magazine's editorial staff were also otokonoko enthusiasts. The artist Akira Kasukabe provided many illustrations for the magazine's covers and for its short stories; other interior artists included Maki Makita, and Yuu Ueda.

The magazine was printed in a JB5  paper format and was published on a quarterly basis. Starting with Reversible! and Sazanami Cherry in 2011, some of the manga featured in the magazine have also been published in collected tankōbon volumes; the two were chosen for being the Waai! manga standing out the most and representing the magazine. Because of the cross-dressing themes in the manga published in Waai!, the magazine staff took special care when designing the covers for the collected volumes, to avoid readers feeling too embarrassed to bring a copy to the checkout in the bookstore, but also used cross-dressing photo models in the marketing for the volumes. A sister magazine focusing solely on manga, Waai! Mahalo, launched on April 25, 2012, and ran for six volumes until December 25, 2013. Like with the main magazine, Kasukabe provided the cover art.

The main Waai! magazine continued until the release of volume 16 on February 25, 2014, after which it was put on an indefinite hiatus, with the editorial staff advising readers to follow the magazine's social media for any potential future updates. Hijikata apologized for the lack of prior warning, saying that it was a sudden development, but that the collected editions of the manga run in the magazine would continue as planned, as would the production of the anime adaptation of the Waai! manga Himegoto. On June 23, 2014, Ichijinsha published the artbook , collecting Kasukabe's art pieces from the magazine.

Content
Waai! and Waai! Mahalo published manga series and one-shots about otokonoko and about male characters engaging in cross-dressing. Although the magazines focused on the manga, the main magazine also contains other features about cross-dressing, including coverage and reviews of anime, manga, and video games with otokonoko or cross-dressing themes, how-to articles about cross-dressing, short stories, interviews, pictures of male models wearing women's clothes, and a section called "Otokonoko Land" with letters from readers. In contrast to other more sexual cross-dressing magazines, Hijikata intended for the magazine to be accessible for a broader audience, while still at times featuring elements of eroticism.

To appeal to a broad range of cross-dressing fiction enthusiasts, the magazine tried to vary the type of stories it ran, with some featuring characters who actively enjoy cross-dressing, and some with characters who are forced to cross-dress through the situation they find themselves in. The stories are frequently also themed around gay male romance and initiations into societal rules around femininity.

Manga

Waai!

Waai! Mahalo

Reception

The first issue of Waai! drew a lot of attention through its focus on male-to-female cross-dressing and was a commercial success, selling well enough to prompt a second printing. Although its main target demographic was men – many of whom were cross-dressers or wanted to cross-dress – Hijikata noted that they also wanted to attract female readers; for the first issue, the vast majority of Waai! readers were male, but the amount of female readers grew with each new issue, and by October 2011, about a third of its readers were women. At that time, the average Waai! reader was in their 20s. It was the leading magazine within the cross-dressing manga niche and was considered to have paved the way for the later cross-dressing magazine Oto Nyan, although the publisher did not divulge the circulation figures.

Japanese entertainment news site Natalie thought that the cross-dressing characters in the Waai! manga were cute and specifically found Reversible! and Sazanami Cherry to be the foundation that the magazine rested on, standing out among the rest of the manga and diversifying the magazine's content. Himegoto was another popular series, with both Hime and Kaguya appearing in the results of a 2016 Goo Rankings survey of the most popular otokonoko characters in Japan. Jonathan Clements, writing for Neo, found Waai! conceptualization of femininity too overtly consumerist and materialistic, describing it as that of a beautician's, and considered the manga stories aside from the cross-dressing themes to often be all-male-cast retreads of old manga conceits. However, he found it difficult to criticize the magazine's motives without inadvertently also criticizing cross-dressers' lifestyles. Da Vinci found the magazine comprehensive, with its combination of entertainment and how-to guides, and still found it an "indispensable magazine" for cross-dressers and cross-dressing enthusiasts by 2017. Yuricon founder Erica Friedman posted a eulogy to the magazine after its discontinuation, speaking to the frustration of a magazine or serialized manga shutting down as publishers fail to draw new readers in.

References

External links
  

2010 establishments in Japan
2012 establishments in Japan
2013 disestablishments in Japan
2014 disestablishments in Japan
Cross-dressing in anime and manga
Defunct magazines published in Japan
Ichijinsha magazines
LGBT in anime and manga
Magazines disestablished in 2013
Magazines disestablished in 2014
Magazines established in 2010
Magazines established in 2012
Men's magazines published in Japan
Seinen manga magazines
Quarterly manga magazines published in Japan
Magazines published in Tokyo